Chakradharpur railway division is one of the four railway divisions under South Eastern Railway zone of Indian Railways. This railway division was formed on 14 April 1952 and its headquarter is located at Chakradharpur in West Singhbhum district of the state of Jharkhand of India.

Kharagpur railway division, Adra railway division and Ranchi railway division are the other three railway divisions under SER Zone headquartered at Garden Reach, Calcutta.

The Chakradharpur Railway Division extends from: 
1. Asanboni station in Jharkhand to Jharsuguda station in Odisha on the Howrah - Mumbai Main Line, important stations in this route includes: Tatanagar, Chakradharpur, Rourkela and Jharsuguda. 
Chakradharpur Division also includes the following lines:
2. Rajkharsawan station to Gua/Bolani Khadan in Jharkhand/Odisha respectively and from Padapahar station in Jharkhand to Jaroli station in Odisha, important stations in this route are Chaibasa, Dangoaposi, Noamundi, Barbil and Banspani. 
3. Sini station to Manikui station and the Kandra-Gamharia stretch in the state of Jharkhand. 
4. The Tatanagar station in Jharkhand to Gorumahisani/Badampahar stations via Rairangpur Jn. in Odisha.
5. Rourkela station to Bitmitrapur station in Odisha.
6. Bondamunda station to Barsuwan/Kiriburu via Bimlagarh Jn. in Odisha/Jharkhand respectively.
7. Bondamunda station to Nuagaon station in Odisha on the Bondamunda - Ranchi line.
8. Jharsuguda to Sardega New line for Mahanadi Coal Fields Limited in Odisha.
The Division serves three districts of Jharkhand (East and West Singhbhum and Saraikela-Kharsawan) and five districts of Odisha (Sundragarh, Jharsuguda, Sambalpur, Mayurbhanj and Keonjhar).

Tatanagar being the most important station of the Division, followed by Rourkela, Jharsuguda, Chakradharpur, etc. The main source of income of the division is from Freight and it is one of the highest earning Division out of 67 divisions of entire Indian Railways. The major components carried by Freight Trains in this section are Coal, Iron Ore, Finished Steel, Manganese and Limestone. In Financial Year 2016-17 Chakradharpur Division crossed loading capacity of 100 Million Tonnes and the target is increasing year on year. The major industries served by the division are Tata Steel, Tata Motors, Lafarge Cement, Associate Cement Company (ACC), Orissa Cement Ltd. (OCL), Bihar Sponge Iron, SAIL Gua/Kiriburu/Manoharpur, SAIL Rourkela, Vedanta Jharsuguda, Jindal (JSW), Adhunik Ispat Alloys, Usha Martin, Mahanadi Coal Fields Ltd. (MCL), etc. and many other small and medium industries.

List of railway stations and towns 
The list includes the stations under the Chakradharpur railway division and their station category.

Stations closed for Passengers -

References

 
Divisions of Indian Railways
1952 establishments in Bihar